Neoasterolepisma gauthieri is a species of silverfish in the family Lepismatidae.

Subspecies
These two subspecies belong to the species Neoasterolepisma gauthieri:
 Neoasterolepisma gauthieri calvum Molero, Mendes, Gaju & Bach, 1994
 Neoasterolepisma gauthieri gauthieri

References

Further reading

 

Lepismatidae
Articles created by Qbugbot
Insects described in 1941